The 2016–17 Fairfield Stags men's basketball team represented Fairfield University during the 2016–17 NCAA Division I men's basketball season. The Stags, led by sixth-year head coach Sydney Johnson, played their home games at Webster Bank Arena with two games at Alumni Hall in Bridgeport, Connecticut as members of the Metro Atlantic Athletic Conference. They finished the season 16–15, 11–9 in MAAC play to finish in fifth place. As the No. 5 seed in the MAAC tournament, they lost in the quarterfinals to Siena. They were invited to the CollegeInsider.com Tournament where they lost in the first round to UMBC.

Previous season
The Stags finished the 2015–16 season 19–14, 12–8 in MAAC play to finish in a tie for fourth place. They defeated Saint Peter's in the quarterfinals of the MAAC tournament before losing to Monmouth in the semifinals. They were invited to the CollegeInsider.com Tournament where they lost in the first round to New Hampshire.

Roster

Schedule and results

|-
!colspan=9 style=| Exhibition

|-
!colspan=9 style=| Regular season

|-
!colspan=9 style=| MAAC tournament

|-
!colspan=9 style=| CIT

References

Fairfield Stags men's basketball seasons
Fairfield
Fairfield
Fairfield Stags
Fairfield Stags